Diego Stocco (born 1976) is an Italian sound designer and composer for movies, television and video games. He also constructs musical instruments and has used both a tree and a burning piano in his pieces.

Stocco was born in Rovigo, Italy.

Movies
His most notable works in cinema are Takers, Sherlock Holmes, Crank and Into The Blue.

TV
Diego served as music sound designer for TV shows The Tudors, Moonlight and Sleeper Cell.

Gaming
He has done sound design and performed for video games such as Assassin's Creed, Far Cry Instincts and The Conduit.

Virtual instruments
He also designed and programmed sound for Korg Z1, Spectrasonics Atmosphere, Omnisphere and Trillian, Bob Moog Tribute Library. He has released some of his albums on Bandcamp.

References

External links 
 
 

1976 births
Inventors of musical instruments
Italian composers
Italian male composers
Living people
Sound designers
People from Rovigo